The Real Housewives of Vancouver (abbreviated RHOV) was a Canadian reality television series that premiered on Slice on April 4, 2012. Developed as the first Canadian installment of The Real Housewives franchise, it aired two seasons.

The first season consisted of Jody Claman, Christina Kiesel, Reiko MacKenzie, Ronnie Negus and Mary Zilba.

Of the original housewives, Christina Kiesel and Reiko MacKenzie left after season one, which saw Claman, Negus and Zilba return for a second season alongside Amanda Hansen, Robin Reichman and Ioulia Reynolds.

The show's success allowed for the development of a similar spin-off series based in Toronto.

Overview and casting

The show premiered on April 4, 2012. The two-hour premiere was the highest-rated premiere in the network's history, attracting 1.2 million viewers. The final episode of season 1 aired on July 4, 2012.

On May 30, 2012, Slice announced that the series was renewed for a second season. Production for season two began on July 9, 2012 with Jody Claman, Ronnie Seterdahl Negus, and Mary Zilba returning with new cast members, Amanda Hansen, Ioulia Reynolds, and Robin Richmond Reichman, whom Slice described as a "former party girl", a "Russian-born beauty" and a "southern belle" respectively. The second season premiered on February 5, 2013. Slice chose to pass on a reunion for the second season in order to provide more episodes rather than having to cut the season even shorter.

On June 6, 2013, Slice announced that it had put the series "on hold" while it explored other programming. On June 27, 2014, Jody Claman stated she was no longer a celebrity during her divorce trial. While the show has not been on air since 2013, Slice have not confirmed nor denied that it has been cancelled. In 2016, former cast members were contacted for a "Where Are They Now?" segment that Slice holds on their main site.

Timeline of housewives

Episodes

International broadcast
The series has received rather critical and commercial success outside Canada. The series along with the United States installments have aired on Australian cable network Arena, which is home to its own installments, The Real Housewives of Melbourne and Sydney. In the United Kingdom, the British cable networks ITV2 and later ITVBe have also aired the series. It has never officially aired in the United States, but episodes were briefly available to watch online on Hulu.

As of April 1, 2022 both seasons are now available on Tubi marking it the second time in almost a decade that the show has become available in the U.S. albeit on a streaming service.

Awards and nominations

References

External links
 
 

2010s Canadian reality television series
2012 Canadian television series debuts
2013 Canadian television series endings
Television shows filmed in Vancouver
Television shows set in Vancouver
Vancouver
Slice (TV channel) original programming
Television series by Corus Entertainment
Canadian television series based on American television series
Women in British Columbia